GeoSmart (NZ) Ltd is a provider of location-based services, digital mapping data and images for the Oceania area, notably New Zealand.  The company is one of only a handful of global companies producing digital maps for use in GPS applications. GeoSmart was acquired by TomTom in 2014.

Companies such as TomTom and Navman, use mapping data from GeoSmart on their popular handheld GPS devices, as do motor manufacturers such as BMW.  The company also provides mapping data via web services, with applications such as a website that allows users to send custom invitations that include mapping directions for guests  as well as providing the mapping interface on New Zealand Automobile Association website.

In 2008, GeoSmart launched the RAPIDcV mapping car, which is an ongoing program to redrive all of New Zealand. This is to  enhance the car navigation database used by brands including Navman, TomTom, Nav N Go, Siemens VDO and Horizon. The RAPIDcV (Road attributes, points of interest, imagery data capture vehicle) uses technology to capture the road centreline of all of New Zealand's roads to an accuracy of 0.15 metres. It does this with a number of technologies including inertial measurement unit (IMU) that uses gyroscopes and accelerometers. This technology compensates for situations where the traditional differential GPS accuracy is lost when the satellite signal is poor, such as behind volcanic hill shadows, dense forest canopies and high rise urban areas.  It has a number of cameras on board capturing lane information, street signs, turn restrictions and points of interest to enhance and keep up to date GeoSmart's car navigation and web mapping products. It is also taking a 360 degree panoramic image every 50 metres. In order to support truck navigation as well as multi mode navigation it is collecting information on the incline and camber of each corner, a feature which is used for truck safety warnings in fleet management systems.

See also
Geographic Data Files
Navteq
Tele Atlas

References

External links
GeoSmart

GIS companies
Software companies of New Zealand
Companies based in Auckland